"My Heart Goes (La Di Da)" is a song by British singer-songwriter Becky Hill and German DJ Topic. It was released on 24 August 2021 as the fifth single from Hill's debut studio album Only Honest on the Weekend. The song peaked at number 11 on the UK Singles Chart where it spent four consecutive weeks and became the album's fourth top-20 hit.

Track listing

Credits and personnel
Credits adapted from Tidal.

 Josh Wilkinson – producer, composer, lyricist, associated performer, bass, drums, keyboards, sound effect, strings, synthesizer
 Topic – producer, composer, lyricist, associated performer, bass, mixer, music production, percussion, studio personal, synthesizer
 Charlotte Jane Haining – composer, lyricist
 Frank Nobel – composer, lyricist
 Linus Nordström – composer, lyricist
 Becky Hill – composer, lyricist, associated performer, vocals
 Stuart Hawkes – mastering engineer, studio personnel

Charts

Weekly charts

Year-end charts

Certifications

References

2021 singles
2021 songs
Becky Hill songs
Topic (DJ) songs
Number-one singles in Poland
Songs written by Becky Hill
Songs written by Topic (DJ)